David McDonald Norman Jr. (born 6 May 1962) is a Canadian former footballer who played as a defensive midfielder.

Club career
Scotland-born Norman grew up playing soccer in Coquitlam, British Columbia and went on to play 17 years as a professional.
Norman began his pro career with the Vancouver Whitecaps of the North American Soccer League from 1981 to 1984, scoring three goals. During the winter months between 1980 and 1982, he played for University College Dublin A.F.C., in the League of Ireland, making 45 appearances and scoring 8 goals. Along with three Canadian teammates he was released in February 1982. Norman played one season of indoor soccer for the Whitecaps in 1983–84. He also played for the Tacoma Stars of the original Major Indoor Soccer League, and for the Winnipeg Fury, Calgary Kickers, Calgary Strikers, Edmonton Brick Men and Vancouver 86ers.

International career
He made his debut for Canada in a December 1983 friendly match against Honduras and earned 49 caps, scoring 1 goal. He played all three of the country's 1986 World Cup games. Norman also played for the Canadians at the 1984 Olympics. Norman, together with three other Canadian players, Igor Vrablic, Hector Marinaro and Chris Chueden, was involved in a match fixing betting scandal at the Merlion Cup tournament in Singapore two months after the World Cup.

International goals
Scores and results list Canada's goal tally first.

After playing
Norman has coached for Coquitlam MFSC since 1989 as well coaching with the Whitecaps Prospects programmes. Norman is also the football colour commentator on The TEAM 1040 in Vancouver for the Vancouver Whitecaps FC Major League Soccer radio broadcasts. He is the father of another pro-footballer, David Norman Jr.

References

External links
 
 
 NASL/MISL stats

1962 births
Living people
Soccer people from British Columbia
Canadian colour commentators
Canadian expatriate soccer players
Canadian expatriate sportspeople in Ireland
Canadian soccer players
Canadian Soccer League (1987–1992) players
American Professional Soccer League players
Canada men's international soccer players
CONCACAF Championship-winning players
Association football midfielders
Footballers at the 1984 Summer Olympics
League of Ireland players
Major Indoor Soccer League (1978–1992) players
Naturalized citizens of Canada
North American Soccer League (1968–1984) players
North American Soccer League (1968–1984) indoor players
Footballers from Glasgow
People from Coquitlam
Scottish emigrants to Canada
Olympic soccer players of Canada
1986 FIFA World Cup players
Tacoma Stars players
Expatriate association footballers in the Republic of Ireland
University College Dublin A.F.C. players
Vancouver Whitecaps (1986–2010) players
Vancouver Whitecaps (1974–1984) players
Winnipeg Fury players
Calgary Kickers players
Edmonton Brick Men players
Sportspeople involved in betting scandals
Association football controversies